Thomas Owen Edwards (March 29, 1810 – February 5, 1876) was a U.S. Representative from Ohio for one term from 1847 to 1849.

Biography 
Born in Williamsburg, Indiana, Edwards completed preparatory studies.
He studied medicine at the University of Maryland, Baltimore.
He moved to Lancaster, Ohio, in 1836 and engaged in the practice of medicine.

Edwards was elected as a Whig to the Thirtieth Congress (March 4, 1847 – March 3, 1849).
He was an unsuccessful candidate for reelection in 1848 to the Thirty-first Congress.
He attended former President John Quincy Adams, who was then a Congressman, when he suffered a fatal stroke in the Hall of the House of Representatives.
He served as inspector of marine hospitals.
He moved to Cincinnati, Ohio, and engaged in the drug business.
He served as member and president of the city council.
Professor in the Ohio Medical College, Cincinnati, Ohio.
He moved to Madison, Wisconsin, and thence to Dubuque, Iowa.
During the Civil War served as surgeon in the 3rd Iowa Infantry|Third Regiment, Iowa Volunteer Infantry.
He returned to Lancaster, Ohio, about 1870 and resumed the practice of medicine.
He moved to Wheeling, West Virginia, in 1875 and continued the practice of his profession.
He died in Wheeling, West Virginia, February 5, 1876.
He was interred in Mount Wood Cemetery.

Sources

External links
 

1810 births
1876 deaths
Cincinnati City Council members
Politicians from Dubuque, Iowa
People from Wayne County, Indiana
Politicians from Wheeling, West Virginia
People of Iowa in the American Civil War
Physicians from Ohio
Physicians from West Virginia
University of Cincinnati faculty
University of Maryland, Baltimore alumni
Whig Party members of the United States House of Representatives from Ohio
19th-century American politicians
Union Army surgeons